S-arrestin is a protein that in humans is encoded by the SAG gene.

Members of arrestin/beta-arrestin protein family are thought to participate in agonist-mediated desensitization of G-protein-coupled receptors and cause specific dampening of cellular responses to stimuli such as hormones, neurotransmitters, or sensory signals. S-arrestin, also known as S-antigen, is a major soluble protein in photoreceptor cells that is involved in desensitization of the photoactivated transduction cascade. It is expressed in the retina and the pineal gland and inhibits coupling of rhodopsin to transducin in vitro. Additionally, S-arrestin is highly antigenic, and is capable of inducing experimental autoimmune uveoretinitis. Mutations in this gene have been associated with Oguchi disease, a rare autosomal recessive form of night blindness.

References

Further reading